Kamieniec Castle is a 14th-century Gothic castle ruin, which was expanded in the 16th century expanded in a Renaissance form. The fortress is located on the borderlands between Korczyna and Odrzykoń in Krosno County, Podkarpackie Voivodeship, Poland.

See also
Korczyna
Odrzykoń
Castles in Poland

References

Castles in Podkarpackie Voivodeship